Jeffrey David Hackett (born June 1, 1968) is a Canadian former professional ice hockey goaltender who played 15 seasons in the National Hockey League (NHL) with the New York Islanders, San Jose Sharks, Chicago Blackhawks, Montreal Canadiens, Boston Bruins and Philadelphia Flyers. He served as the Colorado Avalanche's goaltending coach for three seasons following his playing career.

Playing career
Hackett grew up studying Tony Esposito and patterned his game after him. He was drafted by the New York Islanders in the second round of the 1987 NHL Entry Draft after playing in junior for the London Diamonds and the Oshawa Generals. Behind Billy Smith and Kelly Hrudey on the Islanders' goaltending depth chart, Hackett split his first two seasons with New York and the Springfield Indians of the American Hockey League (AHL). He led Springfield to a Calder Cup win in 1990 and was awarded the Jack A. Butterfield Trophy, annually given to the most valuable player of the playoffs.

The San Jose Sharks claimed him in the 1991 NHL Expansion Draft. During his first season in San Jose, Hackett was named team MVP for his play. However, after winning only two games in 1992-93, one of them a Sharks' record 57-save effort against the Kings, Hackett was dealt to the Chicago Blackhawks prior to 1993–94 and he backed up Ed Belfour for several seasons. His excellent play in 1996–97 allowed the Blackhawks to trade Belfour to San Jose mid-season. His only full season as Chicago's top goaltender was highlighted by a career-high eight shutouts.

A month into the season, Hackett was involved in a six-player trade which sent him to the Montreal Canadiens. He quickly became a fan favorite in Montreal as he recorded career highs in games played (63) and wins (26). After another solid season in 1999–2000, Hackett was limited to fifteen games in 2000–01 and eighteen games in 2001–02 due to a shoulder injury and lost the starter's job to 2002 Vezina Trophy winner José Théodore in the process. This signaled the end of his stint with Montreal as midway through 2002–03 he was involved in a three-way trade which sent him back to San Jose temporarily and then on to the Boston Bruins.

The Bruins, who had been looking for a number one goaltender, threw Hackett into that role. After shutting out Philadelphia in his Boston debut, Hackett played well until a broken finger caused him to miss time including the start of the Bruins' playoff series with New Jersey, forcing Boston to go with Steve Shields.

During the off-season, Hackett signed a two-year contract with the Philadelphia Flyers on the first day of free agency. He started his Flyers career by posting shutouts in his first two games, and accumulated a record of nine wins, two losses and six ties in his first seventeen games. However, in December, he lost six starts in a row and following a win in early January, lost his next two starts. He was diagnosed with positional vertigo and after a one-game rehab stint with the AHL's Philadelphia Phantoms on February 6, Hackett retired on February 9, 2004. Hackett finished his career after appearing in 500 NHL regular season games.

Post-playing career
On July 12, 2006, Hackett was hired as the goaltending coach for the Colorado Avalanche. After three seasons in that role, Hackett was fired on June 3, 2009.
Hackett resides in his hometown of London, Ontario and has turned his attention to minor hockey. His nephew is former NHL goaltender Matt Hackett.

Awards
1986–87 - F. W. "Dinty" Moore Trophy (OHL)
1986–87 - Dave Pinkney Trophy (OHL)
1989–90 - Jack A. Butterfield Trophy (AHL)

Career statistics

Regular season and playoffs

International

References

External links

Jeff Hackett's profile at Hockey Goalies

1968 births
Boston Bruins players
Canadian ice hockey coaches
Canadian ice hockey goaltenders
Colorado Avalanche coaches
Ice hockey people from Ontario
Living people
Montreal Canadiens players
New York Islanders draft picks
New York Islanders players
Oshawa Generals players
Philadelphia Flyers players
Philadelphia Phantoms players
San Jose Sharks players
Sportspeople from London, Ontario
Springfield Indians players
Canadian expatriate ice hockey players in the United States